Porta Vittoria (formerly Porta Tosa) was a city gate in the Spanish walls of Milan, Italy. While the walls and the gate have been demolished, the name "Porta Vittoria" has remained to refer to the district ("quartiere") where the gate used to be. This district is part of the Zone 4 administrative division of Milan.

History
Porta Tosa was the eastern gate of the Spanish walls of Milan, dating back to the 16th century. During the Five Days of Milan, Porta Tosa was the first to be conquered by the Milanese rebels, on 22 March 1848 (an event known as "The Battle of Porta Tosa"). In 1861, when the Italian unification was completed, the gate was renamed "Porta Vittoria" (Victory Gate) after that victorious episode.

What remained of the Spanish walls and gates was demolished in the 19th century. In 1881, Giuseppe Grandi designed an obelisk to be placed in the square where the gate used to be; it was inaugurated on 18 March 1895.

The district
The centre of the Porta Vittoria district is the square where Grandi's obelisk is located; this square is now called Piazza Cinque Giornate ("Five Days Square"). Most streets, avenues, and square in the district are named after heroes and prominent events of the Milanese Risorgimento and the Five Days. A large avenue crossing Piazza Cinque Giornate in east-west direction is called Corso di Porta Vittoria to the west and Corso 22 Marzo to the west. In the north-south direction, the Piazza is crossed by one of the main ring roads of Milan, the Circonvallazione Interna ("inner ringroad", as opposed to the Circonvallazione Esterna, the "outer ringroad" which embraces a much wider area).  In the Porta Vittoria district, the Circonvallazione Interna is composed of streets Viale Montenero and Viale Regina Margherita.

The area is mostly a shopping district, with Piazza Cinque Giornate, as well as the two Corso's, being lined with large stores and shops. To the east, it borders on Città Studi ("city of the studies"), where major universities of Milan have their headquarters.

External links

Districts of Milan